Nimrod was launched in Montreal, Quebec in 1809. She transferred her registry to England, and started trading between Great Britain 
and Honduras. She was wrecked on 17 February 1813.

Career
Nimrod transferred her registry from Quebec City to Greenock, Scotland on 2 January 1810, at (Port) No. 4.]
Nimrod first appeared in Lloyd's Register (LR) in 1810.

Fate
Nimrod, Jack, master, was wrecked on 17 February 1813 near Beachy Head. Jack, two mates, and nine seamen drowned; part of her cargo was saved.

Citations and references
Citations

References
 
 

1809 ships
Ships built in Quebec
Age of Sail merchant ships of England
Maritime incidents in 1813